Varakalpattu  is a revenue village in Cuddalore district, state of Tamil Nadu, India.This is a natural wonders in it and has many features around it.

The famous temples around it and last 100 years ran the government school.

Villages in Cuddalore district